Quriqucha (Quechua quri gold, qucha lake, "gold lake",  Hispanicized spelling Curicocha) is a mountain in the Andes of Peru, about  high. It is located in the Junín Region, Yauli Province, Marcapomacocha District. It lies west of Anta Q'asa and Sillaqaqa and north of Qunchupata.

References

Mountains of Peru
Mountains of Junín Region